Haitham Al-Shboul is a retired Jordanian footballer and football manager. He is a former head coach of Jordanian club Al-Faisaly.

Managerial statistics

Honors and Participation in International Tournaments

In AFC Asian Cups 
2004 Asian Cup

In Pan Arab Games 
1999 Pan Arab Games

In Arab Nations Cup 
2002 Arab Nations Cup

In WAFF Championships 
2000 WAFF Championship
2002 WAFF Championship
2004 WAFF Championship

International goals

References

External links 
 
 

1974 births
Living people
Jordanian footballers
Jordan international footballers
Association football midfielders
Al-Faisaly SC players
Al-Shorta SC managers
Jordanian football managers
Sportspeople from Amman
Jordanian expatriate football managers